Dushanzi District or Maytag District, is a district of the city of Karamay, in the Xinjiang Uyghur Autonomous Region, China and is under the administrative jurisdiction of the Karamay City. According to the 2002 census, it has a population of 60,000.

Transport 
China National Highway 217

County-level divisions of Xinjiang